Ishni Mananelage (born 11 August 1988) is a Sri Lankan-born cricketer who plays for the United Arab Emirates national cricket team. In July 2018, she was named in the United Arab Emirates' squad for the 2018 ICC Women's World Twenty20 Qualifier tournament. She made her Women's Twenty20 International (WT20I) for the United Arab Emirates against Thailand in the World Twenty20 Qualifier on 12 July 2018.

References

External links
 

1988 births
Living people
People from Colombo District
Emirati women cricketers
United Arab Emirates women Twenty20 International cricketers
Sri Lankan emigrants to the United Arab Emirates
Sri Lankan expatriate sportspeople in the United Arab Emirates